Honky Tonk Angel  is the twenty-ninth studio album by American country music artist Conway Twitty, released in 1974. It contains the single and title track "There's a Honky Tonk Angel (Who'll Take Me Back In)".

Track listing

References

1974 albums
Conway Twitty albums